Muthuraman Radhakrishnan (4 July 1929 – 16 October 1981) was an Indian actor who predominantly appeared in Tamil language films. He was a leading actor during the 1960s and 1970s and was fondly called as Navarasa Thilagam. He had paired with all the leading heroines of his time and acted in over a hundred films. Muthuraman's son Karthik is also a popular Tamil actor and politician, and his grandson Gautham Karthik is also an actor who made his debut in Kadal (2013).

Early life 
Muthuraman was born in Thanjavur (Orathanadu Taluk -Okkanadu melayur) to a family that had no stage or acting links. He was the son of an advocate and his uncle was a police officer.  However, in his youth he was attracted towards films and the fine arts.  He joined the field much later in life, as he first became a government employee due to family pressure.

Film career 
In 1947, was acting in stage group called Vairam Nadaka Sabha along with Veteran Manorama, Kulatheivam Rajagopal etc.  He was helped by a known philanthropist Sri KSBS Ganapathi (Late) from Thoothukudi to come in Cine field.

Muthuraman was a stage actor in his early days. He joined veteran actor S.S. Rajendran's SSR Nataka Mandram and then Seva Stage and acted in numerous dramas, including Manimagudam, Muthumandapam and Bharathiyar's poetic dramas.

He acted as Suppu, a simpleton in Thenthoosi, a film that starred Gemini Ganesan in the lead role.  He went to play a few major roles and many secondary roles in about 100 movies in the sixties and seventies.  Although he was a player in an era dominated by stalwarts such as M G Ramachandran, Sivaji Ganesan and Gemini Ganesan, he made a name and place for himself as a popular supporting actor. He is famous for playing a supporting role in movies which starred Sivaji Ganesan specially. This handsome and mature actor was known as Navarasa Thilakam.

He was paired with most heroines of the time, including Chandrakanta, Rajasri, Devika, KR Vijaya, L Vijayalakshmi, Lakshmi, Venniraadai Nirmala, Vijaya Nirmala, Vanishri, Sujata, Bharathi, Srividya, Jayalalithaa and Sripriya, but his most constant heroine with whom he was paired for a record of 19 times was KR Vijaya. He starred in many successful films, in co-hero roles in movies such as Kaadhalikka Neramillai, Ooty Varai Uravu, and supporting roles in movies such as Moondru Deivangal, Server Sundaram. Muthuraman also established a production company, Muthukarthik Pictures.

Family 
Muthuraman was married to Sulochana. The couple had four children, the youngest of whom, Karthik Muthuraman, became a popular actor.

Death 
In October 1981, Muthuraman arrived at Ooty to attend the shooting for Ayiram Muthangal. When he was jogging as part of a routine exercise, he collapsed on the road and became unconscious. Actor Sivakumar who had stayed in the same place, was told that Muthuraman was lying unconscious on the street thereafter Muthuraman was rushed to the hospital by actor Sivakumar. But the doctor declared Muthuraman dead on arrival. He was 52 years old at the time of his death.

Filmography

1980s

1970s

1960s

1950s

References

External links 
 

Male actors from Tamil Nadu
Tamil male actors
1929 births
1981 deaths
Tamil Nadu State Film Awards winners
20th-century Indian male actors
People from Thanjavur district
Male actors in Tamil cinema
Indian Tamil people